Drogeham is a village of about 1,700 inhabitants in the Dutch province of Friesland.

It is in a rural area of the municipality of Achtkarspelen. Agriculture still plays an important part in the town, but small-scale industry is on the increase. Many people have their jobs in nearby larger towns like Drachten, Surhuisterveen, and Leeuwarden. The most common language is still West Frisian although there are more and more people coming to Drogeham who have Dutch as their mother-tongue.

History 
The village was first mentioned in 1475 as Asterham, Drogheham, and means dry land in a bend of a stream. The tower of the Protestant church of Drogeham dates from circa 1225 and was restored in 1704. The church itself extensively modified in 1876. In 1840, Drogeham was home to 264 people.

Notable buildings
 The Protestant church of Drogeham

Gallery

References

External links
For more information about this town see www.drogeham.com (in Dutch)
 

Achtkarspelen
Populated places in Friesland